Heath Culpitt (born 16 February 1978) is an Australian rules footballer who played with Carlton in the Australian Football League.

From Castlemaine, Victoria, Culpitt played football for the Castlemaine Football Club, before being recruited to the AFL by the Carlton Football Club in 1998. He spent four years with Carlton, playing as a utility/midfielder, and played fifteen games between 1999 and 2001 before being delisted.

Since being delisted, Culpitt has played for Glenelg and Norwood in the South Australian National Football League, and for St Mary's and Waratah in the Northern Territory Football League. While with St Mary's in the 2005/06 NTFL season, Culpitt won the Nichols Medal as the league best and fairest.

In 2005, it was revealed that Culpitt was accused of rape in 1999. He was not charged, although the police were criticised for losing evidence in the investigation.

Sources

Carlton Football Club players
Glenelg Football Club players
Norwood Football Club players
Waratah Football Club players
St Mary's Football Club (NTFL) players
Castlemaine Football Club players
Australian rules footballers from Victoria (Australia)
Living people
1978 births